The 2018 South Point 400 was a Monster Energy NASCAR Cup Series race held on September 16, 2018 at Las Vegas Motor Speedway in Las Vegas. Contested over 272 laps—extended from 267 laps due to an overtime finish, on the  asphalt intermediate speedway, it was the 27th race of the 2018 Monster Energy NASCAR Cup Series season, first race of the Playoffs, and the first race of the Round of 16.

Report

Background

Las Vegas Motor Speedway, located in Clark County, Nevada outside the Las Vegas city limits and about 15 miles northeast of the Las Vegas Strip, is a  complex of multiple tracks for motorsports racing. The complex is owned by Speedway Motorsports, Inc., which is headquartered in Charlotte, North Carolina.

Entry list

First practice

Qualifying

Qualifying results

Practice (post-qualifying)

Second practice

Final practice

Race

Stage Results

Stage 1
Laps: 80

For pre-race ceremonies, Motor Racing Outreach chaplain Billy Maudin would give the invocation and Las Vegas country music singer Sierra Black would sing the anthem. Brendan Gaughan, a former NASCAR driver and the son of the South Point's owner, Michael Gaughan would give out the starting command. Temperatures were nearly 100 degrees at the start of the race. Erik Jones would start from the pole, however he would get passed for the lead on lap 1 by Joey Logano, who would go on to lead the first 34 laps until green flag pit stops occurred. At the end of the pit cycle, Kevin Harvick would lead, but was quickly swallowed up by Martin Truex Jr. on lap 59, who then proceeded to stay in the lead for the rest of the stage and win.

Stage 2
Laps: 80

The green flag would come out on lap 87. However, just three laps later NASCAR threw the caution for debris caused by Ricky Stenhouse Jr hitting the wall in turn 3. Truex would go on to lead the first 32 laps in the stage until on lap 112, Ty Dillon would suffer a tire failure. Keselowski would lead on the restart on lap 116. Truex would go back to the lead just 9 laps later. On lap 148, the first major crash happened in the day. Kevin Harvick, who was battling Jimmie Johnson for 7th, would blow a right front and smash his car into the wall. Erik Jones, who was running the high side ran into the back of Harvick, taking both of them out. Keselowski would end up as the leader on the restart, and after a 5 lap shootout would win stage 2.

Final Stage Results

Stage 3
Laps: 107

Keselowski would lead the field to green, and would battle Kyle Larson until lap 184 when William Byron suffered a flat tire and hit the Turn 3 wall. Truex would take the lead back on lap 202. 10 laps later, Jamie McMurray, who had hit the wall laps earlier, would spin with another tire failure, collecting Chase Elliott, causing both of them to retire. Logano would pull out to the lead on the restart against Keselowski. Kyle Busch then would get loose and spin coming out of turn 4, with the splitter hitting the frontstretch grass. Larson would lead on the restart, then on lap 248 Denny Hamlin would suffer a similar crash to Kyle Busch, this time destroying Hamlin's car and taking him out. The field would restart, but just 2 laps later on  lap 253 Ricky Stenhouse Jr. would hit the back stretch wall hard, similar to Jeff Gordon's 2008 crash at the same track. On the restart, Alex Bowman and Jimmie Johnson would suffer tire problems. Due to debris caused by the incidents, NASCAR was forced to throw the caution with 7 to go. With just 2 laps to go, Keselowski would lead the field to green and would battle with Logano. However, a crash started by David Ragan and Michael McDowell would cause the big one of the day, tearing Matt Dibenedetto's right side and massively damaging Kurt Busch's car. NASCAR would throw the red flag due to the accident. The field would attempt a green-white checkered finish, with Brad Keselowski eventually pulling away and winning the inaugural South Point 400.

Race statistics
 Lead changes: 9 among different drivers
 Cautions/Laps: 12 for 59
 Red flags: 1 for 10 minutes and 37 seconds
 Time of race: 3 hours, 28 minutes and 15 seconds
 Average speed:

Media

Television
NBC Sports called the race on the television side. Rick Allen, Jeff Burton, Steve Letarte and Dale Earnhardt Jr. had the call in the booth for the race. Dave Burns, Parker Kligerman, Marty Snider and Kelli Stavast reported from pit lane during the race.

Radio
PRN covered the radio call for the race which was also simulcast on Sirius XM NASCAR Radio. Doug Rice, Mark Garrow and Wendy Venturini called the race in the booth when the field raced through the tri-oval. Rob Albright called the race from a billboard in turn 2 when the field raced through turns 1 and 2. Pat Patterson called the race from a billboard outside of turn 3 when the field raced through turns 3 and 4. Brad Gillie, Brett McMillan, Jim Noble and Heather DeBeaux worked pit road for the radio side.

Standings after the race

Manufacturers' Championship standings

Note: Only the first 16 positions are included for the driver standings.

References

South Point 400
South Point 400
South Point 400
NASCAR races at Las Vegas Motor Speedway